Psych 3: This Is Gus is a 2021 American made-for-television comedy film based on the USA Network dramedy series Psych. The film is a direct sequel to the second film from 2020. The movie was released on November 18, 2021 on Peacock. James Roday Rodriguez, Dulé Hill, Timothy Omundson, Maggie Lawson, Kirsten Nelson, and Corbin Bernsen all reprised their roles from the series and previous two films, with recurring actor Kurt Fuller and previous guest star Curt Smith also appearing. The film was directed by series creator Steve Franks, who co-wrote the script with Roday Rodriguez.

Plot

Prior to Gus and Selene's wedding and the birth of their son, Shawn and Gus must track down Selene's estranged husband, while Gus is in 'groomzilla' mode. Lassiter works to determine the future of his police career.

Cast

Production
On May 13, 2021, Peacock announced the film, with production set to begin in the summer. On October 9, 2021 at New York Comic Con, it was announced the film would premiere on November 18, 2021. Along with the returning main cast, Kurt Fuller reprised his role as Woody Strode and Curt Smith returned as himself.

Reception
TV Guide rated the film a four and a half out of five.

Notes

References

External links
 

Psych episodes
American comedy-drama films
American detective films
American sequel films
2020s English-language films
2021 films
2021 comedy-drama films
Peacock (streaming service) original films
Films set in Santa Barbara, California
Television films based on television series
Television sequel films
Films directed by Steve Franks
2020s American films